Middle East University (MEU) is a national education research consulting non-profit organization in Amman, Jordan, owned by the Company Middle East University for Graduate Studies. It is located near the Queen Alia International Airport(QAIA).

Brief history
The university inaugurated its first phase with the name "The Middle East University" on June 30, 2005, after having completed all the requirements of licensing and accreditation including the provision of qualified faculty members and administrative staff, and developed study plans . it is considered one of the distinguished universities in Jordan that offers the Bachelor's and Master's programmes in many educational field for students. The university received the first batch of students in twelve specialized master's program at the beginning of second semester of the academic year 2005/2006.

Academics
There are nine colleges in the university:
 Faculty of Engineering
 Faculty of Information Technology
 Faculty of Media
 Faculty of Educational Sciences
 Faculty of Law
 Faculty of Architecture & Design
 Faculty of Pharmacy
 Faculty of Arts & Sciences
 Faculty of Business

References

External links

International Affairs Office

Education in the Middle East
Universities in Jordan
Education in Amman
Educational institutions established in 2005
2005 establishments in Jordan